Pororo: Cyberspace Adventure is a 2015 South Korean animated film based on the animated series Pororo the Little Penguin.

Plot

Pororo has a nightmare about losing a video game to Crong and wakes up. Meanwhile, Poby and Harry gets the honey from the bees but gets his nose stung. Eddy invites them over to his house to show them another video game. Loopy trips and spills the drink on Eddy's computer and causes the computer to short circuit and it causes a warp which teleports Pororo and his friends to the video game world where they meet the Prince Chichi who explains he was cursed and the princess kidnapped by the spider King and his henchmen. Pororo must go on a journey to find the cave fairy who will help them get more powerful weapons to defeat the Spider King.

Korean voice cast
Lee Seon: Pororo
Lee Mi-ja: Crong
Ham Su-jung: Eddy
Hong So-young: Loopy
Chung Misook: Petty
Kim Seo-yeong: Harry
Kim Hwan-jin: Poby
Um Sang-hyun: Chichi
Hong Bum-ki: Spider King

English voice cast
 Bill Rogers Poby / Crong (voice, uncredited)

Soundtrack

Porong Porong Pop Pop
Composed and arranged by JUSh
Lyrics by JUSh
Performed by Lee Jungeun

References

External links 
 
 

2010s Korean-language films
South Korean animated films
2010s adventure films
Animated adventure films
2010s South Korean films